Live to Dance is an American television reality program and dance competition on the CBS network based on the British series Got to Dance. Dancers from all over the country auditioned for Live to Dance in "specially constructed Dance Domes".

Resembling the British dance competition series Got to Dance, the show was first shown on January 4, 2011, and was headlined by the American Idol judge Paula Abdul as lead judge with Andrew Günsberg as host. Judging alongside Abdul were Kimberly Wyatt, the former member of Pussycat Dolls, and Michael Jackson's long-time choreographer Travis Payne. The show was intended to rival So You Think You Can Dance and unlike most other reality shows, allowed dancers of all ages to compete. The series was not renewed for a second season.

An Australian version was filmed in 2011. However, it never aired due to a scheduling conflict by another reality dance competition series Everybody Dance Now in 2012.

Auditions
Auditions were held in Los Angeles and New York City inside the Dance Dome.

Top 18
 Bold Print means that the contestant was chosen by the judges/viewers to compete in the Semi-Finals via the Dance-Off.

Dance-Off

Semi-finals

Round 1

Round 2

Round 3

Finalists

Ratings
The series premiere was watched by 10.2 million viewers and was the most watched program of January 4, 2011.  It additionally managed to pull a 2.4 in the Adults 18-49 demographic.  The second episode, which aired in its normal timeslot of Wednesdays at eight p.m., fell hard from those numbers pulling 7.788 million viewers and a 1.8 in the Adults 18-49 demographic.

References

External links 
 Official Website (via Internet Archive)
 Official Casting Site
 
 DomeGuys International Blog of Building the Dance Domes

2011 American television series debuts
2011 American television series endings
Dance competition television shows
CBS original programming
English-language television shows
American television series based on British television series